James A. Rice (born November 15, 1957) is an American attorney, judge, and politician. He is one of the six Associate Justices currently on the Montana Supreme Court. Rice won an unopposed retention vote in 2014. His current term will expire in 2022.

Early life and education 
Rice was born to parents in the United States Military who were stationed at Ramore Air Force Base, near Kirkland Lake, Ontario, Canada. Rice grew up in eastern Montana, and graduated in 1975. He obtained his pilot's license at 17, and worked in aviation-related jobs while attending Montana State University. He graduated with a Bachelor of Arts in political science in 1979, and then earned a Juris Doctor from the University of Montana School of Law in 1982.

Career 
Rice began his career as a public defender in Lewis and Clark County, Montana for four years.

He was elected to three terms in the Montana House of Representatives, and served as House Majority Whip in the 1993 session. He became a partner in the law firm of Jackson & Rice in Helena, Montana, in 1985. On March 15, 2001, he was sworn in as an associate justice of the Montana Supreme Court after appointment by Governor Judy Martz. Rice filled the seat vacated by Karla M. Gray when she was elected Chief Justice of the Montana Supreme Court, November 2000. In 2002, Rice won election to the remainder of the judicial term to which he was appointed. In 2006, he won an unopposed retention vote. In 2014, he defeated W. David Herbert to win a third term.

References

External links
Montana Supreme Court profile of James A. Rice
 Jim Rice's Biography at votesmart.org

1957 births
Living people
Justices of the Montana Supreme Court
Members of the Montana House of Representatives
Montana lawyers
Montana State University alumni
Public defenders
University of Montana alumni
21st-century American judges